Charles François Poerson (1653 – 2 September 1725) was a French painter.  He was director of the French Academy in Rome from 1704 until his death.

Biography
Poerson studied under his own father Charles Poerson and under Noël Coypel. His notable works include "Dispute Between Neptune and Minerva" at Château de Fontainebleau, "Union of the Académie royale de Paris and the Academy of Saint Luke in Rome" at Versailles and participation in the decoration of the Hôtel des Invalides. He was buried in San Luigi dei Francesi, Rome, in a tomb attributed to the sculptor Pierre de L'Estache, who later became another director of the Academy.

References

External links 
 His tomb in San Luigi dei Francesi, Rome, with a portrait bust
 Poerson - works in French museums

1653 births
1725 deaths
Painters from Paris
17th-century French painters
French male painters
18th-century French painters
18th-century French male artists